Aaron Bohrod (21 November 1907 – 3 April 1992) was an American artist best known for his  trompe-l'œil still-life paintings.

Education
Bohrod was born in Chicago in 1907, the son of an emigree Bessarabian-Jewish grocer. Bohrod studied at the School of the Art Institute of Chicago and the Art Students League of New York between 1926 and 1930. While at the Art Students League, Bohrod was influenced by John Sloan and chose themes that involved his own surroundings.

Career

He returned to Chicago in 1930 where he painted views of the city and its working class. He eventually earned Guggenheim Fellowships which permitted him to travel throughout the country, painting and recording the American scene. His early work won him widespread praise as an important social realist and regional painter and printmaker and his work was marketed through Associated American Artists in New York. Bohrod completed three commissioned murals for the Treasury Departments Section of Fine Arts in Illinois; Vandalia in 1935, Galesburg in 1938 and Clinton in 1939. During World War II, Bohrod worked as an artist; first in the Pacific for the United States Army Corps of Engineers' War Art Unit, then in Europe for Life magazine. In 1948, he accepted a position as artist in residence, succeeding John Steuart Curry, at the University of Wisconsin–Madison, and remained in that capacity until 1973. In 1951, Bohrod was elected into the National Academy of Design as an Associate member, and became a full member in 1953. He died from liver cancer at his home in Madison, Wisconsin on 3 April 1992, at the age of 84.

Trompe-l'œil 
In the 1950s, Bohrod developed the trompe-l'œil style of highly realistic, detailed still-life paintings which give an illusion of real life.  It was this style with which he became internationally identified.

Works

Bohrod's works can be found in the collections of many American museums such as the Art Institute of Chicago, the Metropolitan Museum of Art, the Whitney Museum of American Art in New York, and the Hirshhorn Museum in Washington, D.C. The Aaron Bohrod Gallery at the University of Wisconsin–Fox Valley was named in his honor.

Eulogy
"Plastic fish, rubber ducks, broken dolls, toy soldiers, souvenirs of every sort find their way into and fill the compositions of Aaron Bohrod. In doing so, the objects take on meanings far surpassing their original ones, taking on an importance never originally intended for them ... His works often take the form of visual jokes, riddles, or puns in which the artist has fun with the double meanings of commonly used words. Bohrod has a great sense of humor, but beneath it is a bite of the utmost seriousness—often a criticism of the folly and silliness of mankind, his actions and concerns, as exhibited by the faster and faster pace of an ever twisting stream—the spectacle of life." Words of Everett Oehlshlaeger of Everett Oehlschlaeger Galleries Inc., Chicago.

References

Bibliography

External links
 LIFE April 30, 1945

1907 births
1992 deaths
20th-century American painters
American male painters
Art Students League of New York alumni
Artists from Chicago
Jewish American artists
Deaths from liver cancer
School of the Art Institute of Chicago alumni
Trompe-l'œil artists
Painters from Illinois
University of Wisconsin–Madison faculty
American war artists
American muralists
Section of Painting and Sculpture artists
Deaths from cancer in Wisconsin
American people of Russian-Jewish descent
National Academy of Design members
Federal Art Project artists
People from Monona, Wisconsin
20th-century American Jews
20th-century American male artists